Picasso Museum, named after Spanish artist Pablo Picasso (1881-1973), may refer to:

In France
 Musée Picasso (Antibes), Antibes, France
 Musée Picasso, Paris, France
 Musée Picasso (Vallauris), Vallauris, France
In Germany
 Kunstmuseum Pablo Picasso Münster, Münster, Germany
In Spain
 Museu Picasso, Barcelona, Spain
 Museo Picasso de Buitrago, Buitrago del Lozoya, Spain
 Fundación Picasso, Málaga, Spain
 Museo Picasso Málaga, Málaga, Spain